A Piece of Ribbon is a 1963 Australian television play filmed. It was based on an English TV play by Leslie Thomas that had already been performed by the BBC.

It was filmed in Melbourne and was directed by Christopher Muir. Beach scenes were shot in Beaumaris, Wales.

Although based on a British script it is the only Australian made television drama set during the Malayan Emergency.

Plot
During the Malayan Emergency, British soldiers are having a break from jungle patrol at a Malay Beach Club House. Several of them are attracted to a Eurasian girl, Marianna de Souza, who is there to meet her boyfriend Corporal Cutliffe. He arranges to meet Marianna later at a beach.

Marianna is found murdered. Investigations into her death are cut short when the company is sent out on patrol under Sergeant Wiley.

Cast
Neville Thurgood as Sgt Wiley		
Jeffrey Hodgson		
Heather Leembruggen as Marianna de Souza
Geoffrey Hodgson as Corporal Cutliffe
George Whaley
Roly Barlee		
Terry Beattie		
Kurt Beimel		
Robin Farquhar		
Joseph Gentile		
Charles Haggith		
Max Horder		
Paul Karo		
Dennis Miller		
Alwyn Owen		
Joseph Szabo		
Christine Veld

Production
There was a cast of 25 including five models from the Mannequin and Models Guild. The producers shot scenes for the beach at Beaumauris. Heather Leembruggen was from Sri Lanka. The set was designed by Kevin Bartlett.

Reception
The Bulletin'' said the cast, "with one minor exception", were believable as British soldiers.

See also
List of television plays broadcast on Australian Broadcasting Corporation (1960s)

References

External links

Australian television plays
1963 television plays
Films about the Malayan Emergency
Malaysia in fiction